In ecology, plot sampling is a method of abundance estimation in which plots are selected from within a survey region and sampled; population estimates can then be made using the Horvitz–Thompson estimator. Generally plot sampling is a useful method if it can be assumed that each survey will identify all of the animals in the sampled area, and that the animals will be distributed uniformly and independently. If the entire survey region is covered in this manner, rather than a subset of plots that are then used for extrapolation, this is considered a census rather than a plot sampling approach.

See also 
 Mark and recapture

References 

Ecological techniques
Epidemiology
Environmental statistics
Estimation methods